Calligonum comosum, the fire bush, arta or abal, is a species of flowering plant in the family Polygonaceae.

The plant is high in sugar and nitrogen.

It is native to the Sahara, Socotra, the Arabian Peninsula, and in the Middle East as far east as Pakistan and the Rajasthan desert in western India.

The flowers can be eaten fresh. It is useful as a stabilizer of sand dunes, forage for livestock, smokeless firewood, and an indicator of fresh water.

References

comosum
Flora of North Africa
Flora of Mauritania
Flora of Mali
Flora of Niger
Flora of Chad
Flora of Sudan
Flora of Socotra
Flora of the Arabian Peninsula
Flora of Western Asia
Flora of Pakistan
Plants described in 1791